Liz McManus (born 23 March 1947) is a former Irish Labour Party politician who served as Deputy Leader of the Labour Party from 2002 to 2007 and Minister of State at the Department of the Environment from 1994 to 1997. She served as a Teachta Dála (TD) for the Wicklow constituency from 1992 to 2011.

Early life and writing career
McManus was born in 1947 in Montreal, Quebec, Canada. She studied Architecture at University College Dublin, where she shared a drawing desk with Ruairi Quinn. McManus is an accomplished writer. She has won the Hennessy, Listowel and Irish PEN awards in fiction. Her first novel Acts of Subversion was nominated for the Aer Lingus/Irish Times Literature Prize. McManus was also a weekly columnist with the Sunday Tribune from 1986 until 1992.

Political career
She first ran for political office in 1979, when she was elected to Bray Town Council for Sinn Féin the Workers' Party. Later she was elected to Wicklow County Council. She helped establish a women's refuge in Bray in 1978 and was its convenor until 1991.

McManus was first elected to Dáil Éireann at the 1992 general election, as a member of Democratic Left. She retained her seat in every subsequent election until her retirement in 2011. In 1994, Democratic Left formed a government with Fine Gael and the Labour Party, and McManus was appointed as Minister of State at the Department of the Environment, with responsibility for Housing and Urban Renewal, serving until the coalition lost office in 1997. During this period she was also a member of the Northern Ireland Forum for Peace and Reconciliation.

In 1999, Democratic Left merged with the Labour Party, and in 2002 McManus was elected deputy leader of the Labour Party. Another former Democratic Left TD, Pat Rabbitte, became leader of the party. She also became the Labour Party Spokesperson on Health.

She was the deputy leader of the Labour Party and party Spokesperson on Health from 2002 to 2007. Following the resignation of Pat Rabbitte on 23 August 2007, she was acting leader of the Labour Party until September 2007, but chose not to stand for re-election as deputy leader, when a deputy leadership election was held. Joan Burton replaced her as deputy leader. She was party Spokesperson on Communications, Energy and Natural Resources from 2007 to 2011.

She retired from politics at the 2011 general election.

Private life
She was formerly married to John McManus; the couple had four children. They publicly separated in 2006. John McManus, a physician in general practice, was a Labour member of Bray Town Council from 1999 to 2009.

By February 2015 McManus had been with her new partner, Sean, also active in the Labour Party, for ten years.

References

External links
Liz McManus' official website
Lengthy interview with Liz McManus

 

1947 births
Living people
Alumni of University College Dublin
Communist women writers
Democratic Left (Ireland) TDs
Irish novelists
Irish women novelists
Labour Party (Ireland) TDs
Local councillors in County Wicklow
Members of the 27th Dáil
Members of the 28th Dáil
Members of the 29th Dáil
Members of the 30th Dáil
20th-century women Teachtaí Dála
21st-century women Teachtaí Dála
Ministers of State of the 27th Dáil
Sunday Tribune people
Workers' Party (Ireland) politicians
Women ministers of state of the Republic of Ireland